Streptomyces acidiscabies is a streptomycete bacterium species, causing a scab disease of potatoes. Its type strain is RL-110 (= ATCC 49003).

References

Further reading

Zhao, W. Q., X. M. Yu, and D. Q. Liu. "First report of Streptomyces acidiscabies causing potato scab in China." New Disease Reports 19 (2009): 29.

External links

LPSN
Type strain of Streptomyces acidiscabies at BacDive -  the Bacterial Diversity Metadatabase

acidiscabies
Bacteria described in 1989